Francis Cornelius Sullivan (June 7, 1917 – January 5, 2007) was a Canadian ice hockey player. He was a member of the Edmonton Mercurys that won a gold medal at the 1952 Winter Olympics in Oslo, Norway.

External links
Francis Sullivan's profile at databaseOlympics

1917 births
2007 deaths
Ice hockey players at the 1952 Winter Olympics
Olympic gold medalists for Canada
Olympic ice hockey players of Canada
Olympic medalists in ice hockey
Medalists at the 1952 Winter Olympics
Ice hockey people from Saskatchewan
Sportspeople from Regina, Saskatchewan
Canadian ice hockey centres